Come Back to Sorrento is an upcoming American drama film directed by Michael Worth and starring Felicity Huffman and  William H. Macy. It was written by David Mamet, Rebecca Pidgeon and Dawn Powell.

Cast 
 William H. Macy
 Felicity Huffman
 Rebecca Pidgeon

References

External links 
 

Films with screenplays by David Mamet
Upcoming films